Panyapiwat Institute of Management (PIM) is a higher education establishment in Thailand. It was founded in 2007 by CP All, the retail arm of the Thai conglomerate CP Group and the country's operator of 7-Eleven convenience stores. The institute specialises in work-based learning, and serves as a feeder of personnel for CP's businesses.

References

Further reading 
Arpia, V. H. (2016). EFFECTIVENESS OF WORK-BASED LEARNING CURRICULUM OF PANYAPIWAT INSTITUTE OF MANAGEMENT, THAILAND. AU eJournal of Interdisciplinary Research
KATO, K., BHANDHUBANYONG, P., & KADOWAKI, K. (2018). W-07 gPBL for adult education using Kaizen as a theme. In JSEE Annual Conference International Session Proceedings 2018 JSEE Annual Conference (pp. 40–43). Japanese Society for Engineering Education
Utamawoottikumjorn, P. (2013) THE COMPARATIVE STUDY OF PRINCIPLES OF ACCOUNTING LEARNING ACHIEVEMENT: A COMPARISION [sic] BETWEEN PRE-EXAMS AND CHAPTER QUIZZES. In THE 3rd INTERNATIONAL BUSINESS MANAGEMENT RESEARCH CONFERENCE. Chiang Mai, Thailand. http://bmrccmu.net/wp-content/uploads/2014/05/IBMRC-3.pdf

Institutes of higher education in Thailand
Charoen Pokphand